Calotes zolaiking, the Mizoram montane forest lizard,  is a species of agamid lizard. It is endemic to India.

References

Calotes
Reptiles of India
Reptiles described in 2019
Taxa named by Varad B. Giri
Taxa named by Kota Praveen Karanth
Taxa named by Veerappan Deepak